Philippe François Maurice d'Albignac (July 1775 – January 1824), comte d'Albignac, comte de Ried, was a French général de brigade (brigadier general).

References
 Documents historiques et généalogiques sur les familles du Rouergue – tome III – par Hippolyte de Barrau (1857)
 

1775 births
1824 deaths
Commanders of the Order of Saint Louis
École Spéciale Militaire de Saint-Cyr commandants